Mahaveera Bheeman is a 1962 Indian Tamil language film directed by S. A. Subburaman. The film stars T. K. Bagavathi, S. A. Ashokan and Jayashree.

Plot
Mahaveera Bheeman is a character in the Indian Epic Mahabharata written by Vedha Vyasa. The film depicts the part of his life story as told in the epic.

Cast
The following list was adapted from the book Thiraikalanjiyam Part 2.

Male cast
T. K. Bagavathi
S. A. Ashokan
P. V. Narasimha Bharathi
M. L. Pathy
Pal Sarma
E. R. Sahadevan
M. N. Sundar
S. K. Ramaraj
T. K. Sambangi
Gemini Sampath,
Vijayakumar (child actor)

Female cast
Jayashree
L. Vijayalakshmi
T. R. Rajini
T. V. Kumudhini
T. K. Ranjitham
Sumitra
K. S. Angamuthu
Saraswathi
Kumari Jaya
Ratna

Guest artistes
M. R. Radha
V. Nagayya

Production
The film was produced by M. L. Pathy under the banner Jaikumar Pictures. It was directed by S. A. Subburaman who also wrote the story and dialogues.

Soundtrack
Music was composed by M. S. Gnanamani and the lyrics were penned by T. K. Sundara Vathiyar, Kavi Lakshmanadas, Kambadasan, Naavarasu and Solairasu. Playback singers are T. M. Soundararajan, M. K. Sekar, Sirkazhi Govindarajan, V. N. Sundaram, K. Jamuna Rani, P. Leela, S. Janaki, P. K. Saraswathi and Gowsalya.

Notes

References

Hindu mythological films
Films based on the Mahabharata
1960s Tamil-language films